Jacques Dupont (21 April 1921, Ruelle-sur-Touvre – 10 March 2013) was a French film director.

Life 

Formerly of the IDHEC, and a specialist in exotic cinema, he appeared less comfortable in Les Distractions, in which he directed Jean-Paul Belmondo and Alexandra Stewart, than he did in evoking French volunteers in Korea in Crèvecoeur.

Filmography

Short films
 1946 : Au pays des Pygmées
 1947 : Pirogues sur l'Ogooué
 1949 : La Grande case
 1953 : Stock car
 1954 : L'Enfant au fennec
 1955 : Coureurs de brousse

Full features
 1950 : Savage Africa (Congolaise) 
 1955 : Crèvecoeur
 1958 : La Passe du diable (The Devil's Pass) with Pierre Schoendoerffer
 1960 : Les Distractions

References

External links 

1921 births
2013 deaths
French film directors